Arshak Amiryan (born 11 September 1977) is an Armenian professional footballer.

External links
 
 
 eurosport.com

1977 births
Living people
Footballers from Yerevan
Armenian footballers
Association football midfielders
Persian Gulf Pro League players
Bargh Shiraz players
Armenian expatriate footballers
Expatriate footballers in Iran
Armenia international footballers